Yeum Go-eun (born 18 October 1994) is a female South Korean long-distance runner. She competed in the marathon event at the 2015 World Championships in Athletics in Beijing, China.

See also
 South Korea at the 2015 World Championships in Athletics

References

ARRS profile

South Korean female long-distance runners
Living people
Place of birth missing (living people)
1994 births
World Athletics Championships athletes for South Korea